Kalaveti Vodo Ravu is a Fijian politician, and Cabinet Minister. He is a member of the People's Alliance.

He contested the 2022 Fijian general election as a PA candidate and was elected with 1707 votes. On 24 December 2022 he was appointed Minister for Fisheries and Forestry in the coalition government of Sitiveni Rabuka.

References

Living people
People's Alliance (Fiji) politicians
Members of the Parliament of Fiji
Fisheries ministers of Fiji
Year of birth missing (living people)